The String Quartet No. 3 is the third string quartet by the American composer Christopher Rouse.  The work was jointly commissioned by the Festival of Arts and Ideas, the Calder Quartet, Chamber Music America, Carnegie Hall, the Santa Fe Chamber Music Festival, and the LaJolla Music Society.  It was first performed at Yale University on June 18, 2010 by the Calder Quartet, to whom the piece is dedicated.  The composition has a duration of roughly 22 minutes and is composed in one continuous movement.

Composition

Background
The Calder Quartet first approached Rouse about a new commission in 2006 after recording the composer's first and second string quartets. Rouse was unable to begin work on the piece for a couple of years, however, and completed the String Quartet No. 3 in 2009.

Style and inspiration
Rouse described the style and inspiration for the string quartet in the score program notes, writing:
He continued:
Rouse concluded, "The music is staggeringly difficult to play, and I believe this to be my most challenging and uncompromising work to date."

Reception
Steve Smith of The New York Times highly lauded the piece, remarking:
Christian Hertzog of LA Weekly similarly declared the work to be "the most exciting, take-no-prisoners quartet since George Crumb's Black Angels (1971), and it should become just as popular."

References

Rouse 3
2009 compositions
Music commissioned by Carnegie Hall